Jérôme Vanier (born 2 November 1957) is a former professional tennis player from France.

Biography
A left-handed player from Paris, Vanier played collegiate tennis in the United States, first at the University of Dallas, then in the early 1980s for Southern Methodist University.

As a professional player, one of his best performances came in the first round of the 1983 US Open, where he had a straight sets wins over world number 26 Robert Van't Hof.

Since 1994 he has been the Director of the Tennis Club de Lyon.

He is the elder brother of former WTA Tour player Corinne Vanier.

Challenger titles

Doubles: (1)

References

External links
 
 

1957 births
Living people
French male tennis players
Dallas Crusaders
SMU Mustangs men's tennis players
Tennis players from Paris